Latin Fresh, real name Roberto de los Rios Reyes, is a Panamanian reggaeton and reggae en Español artist. He scored national hits in 1995, and toured central and South America in 1997. He completed a three-record contract for Sony Music, later signing to Machete Records, a subsidiary of Universal Music Group, with whom he released Plan Calle in 2006, an attempt to break into the U.S. market.

References

Panamanian reggaeton musicians
Living people
Year of birth missing (living people)